= Sand Springs, Coconino County, Arizona =

Sand Springs, Arizona
- Populated place
- Location within the state of Arizona Sand Springs (the United States)
- Coordinates: 35°43′08″N 110°56′00″W
- Country: United States
- State: Arizona
- County: Coconino
- Elevation: 5,154 ft (1,571 m)
- Time zone: UTC-7 (Mountain (MST))
  - Summer (DST): UTC-7 (MST)
- Area code: 928
- FIPS code: 04-63120
- GNIS feature ID: 10890

Sand Springs is a populated place situated in Coconino County, Arizona, United States. It is one of two locations in Arizona with this name, the other being located in Apache County.
